The Gospel Live is a contemporary gospel concert film produced by Rainforest Films as a companion to the movie The Gospel. Hosted by Anthony Anderson, the concert was filmed live at The Rialto Theater in Atlanta, Georgia and features musical performances by Deitrick Haddon, Mary Mary, Kelly Price, Kierra "Kiki" Sheard and Hezekiah Walker. The DVD also includes artist being interviewed by CeCe Winans and a peek backstage at the premiere of the motion picture The Gospel, including celebrity interviews with Clifton Powell and American Idol star Tamyra Gray. It was released direct-to-video on December 26, 2005.

References

External links 

https://www.youtube.com/movie/the-gospel-live

American documentary films
African-American films
Concert films
Gospel music media
Rainforest Films films
Films produced by Will Packer
2005 films
2000s English-language films
2000s American films